Arnaveh (also Romanized as Ārnāveh and Arnāveh; also known as Aznāveh) is a village in Atrak Rural District, Maneh District, Maneh and Samalqan County, North Khorasan Province, Iran. At the 2006 census, its population was 77, in 15 families.

References 

Populated places in Maneh and Samalqan County